Echorouk TV is an Algerian Arabic language satellite television channel broadcasting from Algiers. Echourouk TV was set up by Echourouk Group with a number of Arab intellectuals from Algeria and the Arab World.

History 
Echorouk TV was founded on 1 November 2011, it has started to broadcast its programs on 6 March 2012.

Operation 
 Chief executive officer
 Ali Fodil
 Commercial/marketing director
 
 News director

Other services

Echorouk TV HD 
The channel simulcasts a network version of Echourouk TV in High Definition, with HD versions of its programs.

Video-on-demand 

Echorouk TV provides video on demand access for delayed viewing of the channel's programming via its desktop and mobile website at EchouroukOnline.com, which allows users to view past and present episodes of Echourouk TV shows in addition to its live programming stream.

Programming

Brand identity

See also 
 DZ Comedy Show

References

External links 
  

Arab mass media
Television in Algeria
Arabic-language television stations
Arabic-language television
 
Television channels and stations established in 2011
Television stations in Algeria